A Language All My Own is a 1935 Fleischer Studios animated short film starring Betty Boop.

Synopsis
Betty flies to Japan to do a show, and sings the title number. She then dons a kimono, and sings it again in Japanese.

Notes and comments
 The studio produced this short after discovering that Betty was very popular in Japan. Animator Myron Waldman, worried that Betty's gestures might offend the conservative Japanese audience, asked a group of Japanese college students to review his work.

References

External links
A Language All My Own on  Youtube
A Language All My Own at the Big Cartoon Database
 Internet Movie Database entry for A Language All My Own

1935 short films
Betty Boop cartoons
Films set in Japan
1930s American animated films
American black-and-white films
1935 animated films
Paramount Pictures short films
Fleischer Studios short films
Short films directed by Dave Fleischer
1930s English-language films
American animated short films